The Mary Riepma Ross Media Arts Center (MRRMAC) is a two-screen theatre located on the University of Nebraska–Lincoln campus that commonly shows a wide variety of documentaries, independent cinema, and international films in the United States of America.  It is also commonly used for class lectures in the Film Studies Program, as well as the Fine and Performing Arts program.

History
Originally, the Sheldon Memorial Art Gallery, which opened in 1964, included a projection booth and auditorium that was used for screening and educational purposes.  However, film exhibition was limited.  In 1990, Mary Riepma Ross, a longtime supporter of the theatre and resident of New York City established a trust for the building of a more adequate media arts center.  The theatre was named to honor her $3.5 million gift, and construction began in June 2001, and opened in December 2003.

Facility
The two screens are equipped with state-of-the-art digital projectors, the first in the world on a university campus.  The projector utilizes Texas Instruments DLP technology.  Both theatres are equipped with Dolby Digital EX, thanks to a generous donation by Dolby.  The two theatres seat 236 and 106 people, respectively.

External links
 Mary Riepma Ross Media Arts Center

Cinemas and movie theaters in Nebraska
University of Nebraska–Lincoln
Culture of Lincoln, Nebraska
Buildings and structures in Lincoln, Nebraska
Tourist attractions in Lincoln, Nebraska